Maliq Akil Johnson (born June 22, 2000) is an American actor. He is known for his role as Jayson Jackson in the Netflix series Grand Army. His films include Little Boxes, Little Men, and Knucklehead.

Early life
Johnson was born in Brooklyn, his first home in Starrett City, to Mark Johnson and Tracy Stith. He grew up in the Bedford–Stuyvesant area where his father co-owned Head Hunter Barbershop from 1996 until its closure in 2015 due to gentrification.

Maliq attended Cobble Hill School of American Studies. His first television appearance was in a 2004 PediaSure commercial. He appeared in catalogues and adverts with gigs such as Verizon, GAP, Target, Pillsbury, Zulily, UFT, Macy's, Sean John, Aéropostale, and Kohl's. He took acting classes with Opening Act. He is now based in Queens.

Filmography

References

External links

2000 births
21st-century American male actors
African-American male actors
American child models
Male actors from New York City
People from Bedford–Stuyvesant, Brooklyn
People from East New York, Brooklyn
Living people
21st-century African-American people
20th-century African-American people